Ngāti Whātua o Kaipara is a Māori iwi and hapū of New Zealand, which is part of Ngāti Whātua.

See also
List of Māori iwi